Lemuel Augustus Penn (September 19, 1915 – July 11, 1964) was the Assistant Superintendent of Washington, D.C. public schools, a decorated veteran of World War II and a Lieutenant Colonel in the United States Army Reserve who was murdered by members of the Ku Klux Klan, nine days after the passage of the Civil Rights Act of 1964.

An African American, Lemuel Penn joined the Army Reserve from Howard University and served as an officer in World War II in New Guinea and the Philippines, earning a Bronze Star.  When he was murdered at the age of 48, he had been an assistant administrator for the public schools in Washington, D.C., and the father of two daughters and one son, Linda, 13, Sharon, 11, and Lemuel Jr., 5. In the 1940s, Penn had worked for Gunnar Myrdal on the landmark study of race relations, An American Dilemma, and is cited in that book's acknowledgments.

Murder
Penn was driving home, together with two other black Reserve officers, to Washington, D.C. from Fort Benning, Georgia returning from their annual summer training camp. Their Chevrolet Biscayne was spotted by three white members of the United Klans of America – James Lackey, Cecil Myers and Howard Sims – who noted its D.C. license plates. Howard Sims – one of the killers – then said "That must be one of President Johnson's boys", evidently motivated by racial hatred. The Klansmen followed the car with their Chevy II with Sims saying "I'm going to kill me a nigger".

The shooting occurred on a Broad River bridge on Georgia State Route 172 in Madison County, Georgia, near Colbert, twenty-two miles north of the city of Athens. Just before the highway reaches the Broad River, the Klansmen's Chevy II pulled alongside Penn's Biscayne. The Klansman, Cecil Myers, raised a shotgun and fired; from the back seat, Howard Sims, also a member of the Ku Klux Klan, did the same. Penn was killed instantly.

Authorities quickly identified James S. Lackey, also a Klansman, and Myers and Sims as the ones who chased the trio of Army reservists. Sims and Myers were tried in state superior court but found not guilty by an all-white jury.

Federal prosecutors eventually charged both for violating Penn's civil rights under the Civil Rights Act of 1964. On June 27, 1966, criminal proceedings began against Sims, Myers, Lackey, and three other local Klansmen, Herbert Guest, Denver Phillips, and George Hampton Turner.  Two weeks later, Sims and Myers were found guilty of conspiracy charges by a federal district court jury; their four co-defendants, however, were acquitted.  Sims and Myers were sentenced to ten years each and served about six in federal prison. Howard Sims was killed with a shotgun in 1981 at age 58. James Lackey died at age 66 in 2002. Cecil Myers died in 2018 at the age of 79.

The historical marker erected by the Georgia Historical Society, the Lemuel Penn Memorial Committee, and Colbert Grove Baptist Church at Georgia Highway 172 and Broad River Bridge on the Madison/Elbert County Border states:
 On the night of July 11, 1964 three African-American World War II veterans returning home following training at Ft. Benning, Georgia were noticed in Athens by local members of the Ku Klux Klan. The officers were followed to the nearby Broad River Bridge where their pursuers fired into the vehicle, killing Lt. Col. Lemuel Penn. When a local jury failed to convict the suspects of murder, the federal government successfully prosecuted the men for violations under the new Civil Rights Act of 1964, passed just nine days before Penn's murder. The case was instrumental in the creation of a Justice Department task force whose work culminated in the Civil Rights Act of 1968. 

Penn's murder was the basis of the Supreme Court case United States v. Guest, in which the Court affirmed the ability of the government to apply criminal charges to private conspirators, who with assistance from a state official, deprive a person of rights secured by the Fourteenth Amendment of the United States Constitution.

References

Bibliography

Further reading

External links
 Lemuel Penn's tombstone at Arlington National Cemetery
 This Day in Georgia History - July 11, 1964 - Lemuel Penn Killed Provided by Georgia Info
 This Day in Georgia History - August 31, 1964 - Trial in Lemuel Penn Murder Case Began Provided by Georgia Info
 

1964 deaths
1964 murders in the United States
Victims of the Ku Klux Klan
People from Washington, D.C.
Burials at Arlington National Cemetery
Murdered African-American people
People murdered in Georgia (U.S. state)
Racially motivated violence against African Americans
Deaths by firearm in Georgia (U.S. state)
July 1964 events in the United States
Deaths by person in Georgia (U.S. state)
Ku Klux Klan in Georgia (U.S. state)